Jaaneman may refer to:

 Jaaneman (1976 film), a Bollywood film
 Jaaneman (2012 film), a Bengali film
 Jaan-E-Mann, a 2006 Bollywood film
 Jan.E.Man, a 2021 Malayalam-language film